Claude Meredith Hilton (born December 8, 1940) is a senior United States district judge of the United States District Court for the Eastern District of Virginia.

Education and career
Born in Scott County, Virginia, Hilton received a Bachelor of Science degree from Ohio State University in 1963 and a Juris Doctor from the Washington College of Law at American University in 1966. He was an assistant commonwealth's attorney of Arlington, Virginia, from 1967 to 1968. He was in private practice in Arlington from 1968 to 1973, was the Commonwealth's Attorney for Arlington County from 1974 to 1975, and returned to private practice from 1976 to 1985. He was also a commissioner in chancery for the Circuit Court of Arlington County from 1976 to 1985.

Federal judicial service
On May 15, 1985, Hilton was nominated by President Ronald Reagan to a new seat on the United States District Court for the Eastern District of Virginia created by 98 Stat. 333. He was confirmed by the United States Senate on July 10, 1985, and received commission the following day. He was Chief Judge from 1997 to 2004, assuming senior status on December 31, 2005. In May 2000, Chief Justice William Rehnquist appointed Hilton as a judge on the Foreign Intelligence Surveillance Court (FISC). His term on the FISC expired on May 18, 2007.

References

External links
 
 Project VoteSmart

1940 births
Living people
Virginia lawyers
Ohio State University alumni
Washington College of Law alumni
Judges of the United States District Court for the Eastern District of Virginia
United States district court judges appointed by Ronald Reagan
20th-century American judges
Judges of the United States Foreign Intelligence Surveillance Court
21st-century American judges